Springfield Lakes is a suburb in the City of Ipswich, Queensland, Australia. It is one of the suburbs created within Greater Springfield.

Geography 
The Centenary Motorway forms the north-western boundary of the suburb. The Springfield railway line runs immediately parallel and north of the highway. There is a foot bridge across the motorway which provides access to Springfield railway station.

The lakes from which the suburb takes its name are:

 Spring Lake, which is named after neighbouring Spring Mountain
 Regatta Lake, named for its intended use for water sports
 Discovery Lake, named for its adventurous surrounding terrain

Springfield Lakes was developed by Lend Lease as a series of smaller neighbourhoods (villages). As of November 2015 these neighbourhoods are: Bridgewater Chase (Springfield), Clancy's Crossing (Springfield), The Escarpment (Springfield), Lakeside, Eden's Homestead, Olive Springs, Butterfly Green, The Promenade, Waterside at The Promenade, The Peninsula, The Summit, Aspect, Creekside, Lakes Entrance, Wildflower Ridge, Park Edge, Tea Trees, Central Walk, and The Sanctuary. The Peninsula is the final neighbourhood of Springfield Lakes developed immediately behind Regatta Lake and Discovery Lake.

History 
Springfield Lakes is one of the suburbs created within Greater Springfield, a  site which is Australia's largest master planned community. For comparison purposes this is more than half the size of Cairns. It was officially named and bounded in 2000.

Springfield Lakes State School opened in 2007.

Good Shepherd Catholic Primary School was established in 2013 by the Catholic Education division of the Roman Catholic Archdiocese of Brisbane.

In the  Springfield Lakes had a population of 15,318 people.

On Friday 1 September 2017, Our Lady of the Southern Cross Catholic Church was officially opened and blessed by Archbishop Mark Coleridge, as the first Catholic church in Greater Springfield. Prior to its opening, Catholic services had been held at St Augustine's College in Augustine Heights.

Transport
The suburb is serviced by bus route 522, which links Goodna station with Springfield Central station. Apart from bus services, the suburb also has access to rail services with the northern part of Springfield Lakes being serviced by Springfield railway station while the southern part of the suburb is serviced by Springfield Central railway station across from Orion Springfield Central shopping centre.

Education 
Springfield Lakes State School is a government primary (Prep-6) school for boys and girls at 63 Springfield Lakes Boulevard. In 2018, the school had an enrolment of 1122 students with 77 teachers (68 full-time equivalent) and 44 non-teaching staff (30 full-time equivalent). It includes a special education program.

Good Shepherd Catholic Primary School is a Catholic primary (Prep-6) school for boys and girls at 58 Opperman Drive. In 2018, the school had an enrolment of 267 students with 17 teachers (15 full-time equivalent) and 14 non-teaching staff (9 full-time equivalent).

There are no secondary schools in Springfield Lakes. The nearest government secondary schools are Springfield Central State High School in neighbouring Springfield Central to the west and Woodcrest State College in neighbouring Springfield to the north-west.

Amenities 
Our Lady of the Southern Cross Catholic Church is at 58 Opperman Drive adjacent to the Catholic school.

Attractions 

Marsdenia Lookout is accessed from the north-west corner of Angelica Drive and Dandelion Drive. It offers views across the Greater Springfield area.

References

External links

Springfield Lakes

Suburbs of Ipswich, Queensland